The Murrawarri Republic is a micronation that declared its independence from Australia in 2013, claiming territory straddling the border of the states of New South Wales and Queensland within Australia. The territory is the traditional homeland of the Murrawarri people, an Aboriginal people, but the population now comprises mostly non-Indigenous Australians. The Government of Australia has not acknowledged the declaration of independence, and their independence has been wholly unrecognised.

Declaration of the Continuance of the State of Murrawarri Nation
On 30 March 2013, the Murrawarri Republic released a declaration announcing its independence. The Peoples Council of the Murrawarri gave the Queen of England [sic] (Elizabeth II), the Prime Minister of Australia (Julia Gillard), as well as the Premiers of Queensland (Campbell Newman) and New South Wales (Barry O'Farrell) 21 days to respond to the declaration.

The specific requests made to Queen Elizabeth II were:

 Treaty documents between the Murrawarri Nation and the Crown of Great Britain outlining the conditions of such a treaty,
 A Deed of Cession document that show the Murrawarri Nation has ceded Sovereignty, Dominion and Ultimate (Radical) to the Crown of Great Britain, or
 Documents showing a declaration of war against the Murrawarri Nation and its people by the Crown of Great Britain.

The deadline expired on 8 May 2013, with the Crown failing to give a response. The Council interpreted their failure to produce the requested documents to be affirmation by the Crown of "the Murrawarri Republic to be a continued Free and Independent State, in line with International law and covenants". On 12 May 2013, the Murrawarri people took their sovereignty campaign to the United Nations, asking that they be recognized as the world's newest country. On 13 May 2013, the Murrawarri Republic established a Ministry of Defence. The Declaration of Continued Independence, states that there shall be a referendum for the establishment of the elected  not later than 1 April 2014 and that until such a referendum the People's Council shall act as the governing body.

On 30 May 2013, Time reported that Attorney-General’s Department of the Australian Government had not replied because there was no legal basis for a reply, a view backed by George Newhouse, a Sydney-based human-rights lawyer known for his work with indigenous Australians.

Geography

The Murrawarri Republic website identifies its territory as being roughly triangular in shape, traversing the Queensland/New South Wales border with its easterly apex close to the two state borders about 600 km from the Pacific Ocean, on the landward side of the Great Dividing Range, its north-westerly apex close to the Queensland town of Cunnamulla  and its southwesterly apex at the confluence of the Darling and Warrego Rivers.  It is roughly 200 km from east to west and about 250 km from north to south.  The republic’s website quotes its area as being , but this area is inconsistent with measurements taken from the map.

The study also concluded that "the proclamation of the Republic of Murrawarri is currently exerting a significant influence over similar contexts in Australia", thus reinforcing the debate on Aboriginal sovereignty.

The First Peoples Worldwide website quotes the population of the Murrawarri republic as being approximately 4,000, but this value is inconsistent with census figures.  

The dominant vegetation and climate, based on the Köppen classification, is described as hot, persistently dry grassland. The average maximum and minimum temperatures in January are about 36°C and 18°C respectively and in July are 22°C and 5°C respectively.  The rainfall is approximately 360 mm per annum, with more rain falling in the summer than in the winter. 

The Mitchell Highway (A71) traverses the territory from north to south.

Provisional Council of State
The Provisional Council of State is the governing body of the Murrawarri Republic. The first meeting of the People's Council was held at Weilmoringle on 13 July 2013, where the meeting passed a unanimous resolution to establish the Provisional Council of State.

It is made up of 11 members who are Fred Hooper, Kevin Hooper, Phyllis Cubby, Evelyn Barker, Sam Jefferies, Desmond Jones, Phillip Sullivan, Julie Johnston, Gloria Johnston, Sharni Hooper, and Alison Salt. Fred Hooper is the current chairman of the Provisional Council of State.

Flag meaning
The brown represents the land, and the light blue represents the sky, where Murrawarri spirits reside until their return on the falling star, as well as the water and the people. Together, the colors represent mother earth. The white star in the upper left corner has eight points which represent the eight clan groups of the Murrawarri Republic.

See also

Secessionism in Western Australia
States and territories of Australia
List of active separatist movements in Oceania
List of micronations
List of proposed states of Australia
List of states with limited recognition

Notes

References

Further reading

External links

Official proposed country website
Official people's website

Indigenous Australian politics
States and territories established in 2013
Micronations in Australia
Aboriginal micronations